SMS Niobe was a  28-gun sixth-rate sailing frigate built for the Royal Navy in the 1840s. She was never commissioned into the Royal Navy, which was converting to steam power, and was sold to Prussia in 1862. She was named after Niobe, a figure from Greek mythology. She served with the Prussian Navy, the North German Federal Navy and the Imperial German Navy as a training ship until stricken and hulked in 1890. Niobe was eventually broken up in 1919.

Description
The ship was considered to be a very good sea boat and very manoeuvrable, although she did suffer from severe pitching. Niobe was designed for a crew of 240 officers and enlisted men, but her crew numbered 34 officers and 316 enlisted men in Prussian service.

She was 1051  tons burthen in size and displaced .

In British service, Niobe was intended to be armed with twenty 32-pounder (45 cwt) smoothbore on the upper deck. The ship was also fitted with one 68-pounder (56 cwt) smoothbore shell gun and ten short 32-pounder guns on her quarterdeck and another 68-pounder and four more short 32-pounders on her forecastle. All of these 32-pounders were of the lighter 25 cwt model. The Prussians rearmed her with sixteen 68-pounder guns and four 30-pounder smoothbore guns. Niobe was later rearmed with six 22-calibre  rifled guns. These were later replaced by six 23-calibre  rifled guns.

Service history
Niobe was laid down in May 1847 at the Devonport Dockyard and launched on 18 September 1849. Completed on 5 October, the ship was never commissioned in the Royal Navy. She was sold to Prussia on 9 July 1862 for the price of £15,892 and used as a training ship for naval cadets from 12 October. In 1865, Niobe was commanded by the future admiral, Carl Ferdinand Batsch and among its cadets were seven future admirals, Alfred von Tirpitz, Wilhelm Büchsel, Oscar Klausa, Iwan Oldekop, Otto von Diederichs, Richard Geissler, and Oscar Boeters. Accompanied by the brig SMS Rover, the ship visited Plymouth, Madeira, the Cape Verde Islands, Cadiz, and Lisbon from 30 September 1865 to 15 May 1866. After serving in the successive navies of the emerging German state, Niobe was stricken from the navy list on 18 November 1890 and hulked at Kiel, eventually being broken up in 1919. The ship's figurehead survives and is located at the Naval Academy at Mürwik.

Notes

Footnotes

References

External links
 

 

Frigates of the Royal Navy
Ships built in Plymouth, Devon
1849 ships
Thetis-class frigates
Ships of the Prussian Navy